Adone Stellin (3 March 1921 – 14 May 1996) was an Italian footballer who played as a defender. He competed in the men's tournament at the 1948 Summer Olympics.

References

External links
 

1921 births
1996 deaths
Italian footballers
Italy international footballers
Olympic footballers of Italy
Footballers at the 1948 Summer Olympics
Footballers from Veneto
Association football defenders
Udinese Calcio players
Calcio Padova players
Genoa C.F.C. players
S.S.C. Bari players
People from Schio
Sportspeople from the Province of Vicenza